The following is a list of people executed by the U.S. state of South Carolina since 1985.

There have been a total of 43 executions in South Carolina since 1985. All of the people executed were convicted of murder. Of the 43 people executed, 36 were executed via lethal injection and 7 via electrocution.

See also 
 Capital punishment in South Carolina
 Capital punishment in the United States
 George Stinney, executed in South Carolina in 1944 at the age of 14

Notes 


References

External links 
 South Carolina Department of Corrections Capital Punishment Web Site

 
South Carolina
Executed